Telasco José Segovia Pérez (born 2 April 2003) is a Venezuelan professional footballer who plays as a midfielder for Italian  club Sampdoria.

Club career
Segovia made his professional debut with Deportivo Lara in a 3–1 Venezuelan Primera División loss to Carabobo on 8 September 2019. On 9 March 2021, he debuted in Copa Libertadores in a 2–1 loss to Santos.

On 10 August 2022, Segovia signed a four-year contract with Sampdoria in Italy.

International career
Segovia made his debut for the Venezuela national team on 28 January 2022 as an 85th-minute substitute for Darwin Machís in a 4–1 home win over Bolivia.

Honours
Individual
Maurice Revello Tournament Golden Ball: 2022
Maurice Revello Tournament Best XI: 2022

References

External links
 Profile at the Asociación Civil Deportivo Lara website
 

2003 births
Living people
Sportspeople from Barquisimeto
Venezuelan footballers
Association football midfielders
Venezuela international footballers
Venezuela under-20 international footballers
U.C. Sampdoria players
Asociación Civil Deportivo Lara players
Venezuelan Primera División players
Venezuelan expatriate footballers
Venezuelan expatriate sportspeople in Italy
Expatriate footballers in Italy